F2008 may refer to:

 Ferrari F2008, a Formula One car
 Fortran, a programming language